Lou Zhenggang (pronounced "Lo Jeng Gong" in English, "Ro Sei Ko" in Japanese; born July 8, 1966 in Heilongjiang, China) is a prominent contemporary Chinese artist. Trained in calligraphy from an early age, she attained national fame as a child prodigy, was sent to a government-sponsored fine arts academy and trained by China's masters of calligraphy and ink painting. She won numerous competitions and exhibited both at home and abroad. At the age of 20, Lou moved to Japan, where she soon had several highly acclaimed exhibitions, wrote illustrated columns for prominent local magazines and was featured regularly on a national television program for three years. Though Lou's work is best known in China and Japan, it has been shown in Paris and New York and is held in numerous collections, both public and private. She continues to live and work in Tokyo.

Overview: Life and work

A summary of Lou's life and work according to an affiliate of the Chinese government states in part: "Lou Zhenggang took up the brush when she was only three. By 12, she had won nationwide recognition as a child prodigy. Her career in art seemed an unending succession of prizes and accolades... Today she is a master of her arts - painting and calligraphy - and seasoned by a maturity in which she has found peace and contentment... Lou Zhenggang's works are in high demand in Japan and United States, whether they be her calligraphy or her painting. Her brush works are prized as gifts from the government of China to visiting dignitaries. Her works are collected and exhibited in over eighty prestigious venues around the globe, including China's Palace Museum, and the United Nations Headquarters. It's well over twenty years, since she was celebrated as an exceptionally gifted prodigy. Today she is among the most influential of Eastern brush artists."

Art

Because Lou was extensively trained in classical Chinese calligraphy, expressions of that tradition formed the initial basis of her art. Even at this time, here style was distinctive: "Lou Zhenggang's earliest works earned praise from senior critics especially for their masculinity and grandeur, qualities seldom found in a female artist." As she entered her twenties, she began to develop a more personal style. Indeed, observers who cannot read Chinese can see in these early works a progression from a strong, formal, masculine style to a more fluid and relaxed approach. As she continued to develop confidence and to experiment with different techniques, her style grew even bolder and less traditional. In Japan, she studied painting with noted nihonga artist Matazo Kayama (加山又造 1927-2004), which led to a flourishing of colorful styles and abstract themes — something she could not have produced if she remained within the pure calligraphic traditions of her youth. She continued to expand her range, developing even more abstract works, including color paintings, silk screens, and classic black ink (sumi) artwork. By the age of 40, she had developed an entirely new painting style, one based upon but transcending calligraphic art, which won her considerable acclaim.

Biography

Early years (-to 1986)
Lou began to study calligraphy with her father, Lou De Ping, at the age of three. At twelve, she was recognized by the national government as an "exceptionally gifted child." As a certified child prodigy, she received special permission to enroll years early at the Central Academy of Fine Art, where she was taught by masters of calligraphy and ink painting. In 1980, she won first prize at the National Youth Calligraphy Exhibition in China, and one year later was elected a member of the Chinese Calligrapher’s Association.
At the age of 14, she was the youngest-ever participant in the Australian-sponsored International Calligraphy Competition, and at 16 she won the Chinese National Calligraphy Competition. In the mid-1980s, she attended Beijing University. In 1985, Hong Kong TV broadcast a documentary about her life and her work. With the support of her government, she traveled to Japan in 1986 and held her first exhibition there, at the Yaesu Gallery in Tokyo.

Twenties (1987-1996)
In 1987, she moved to Tokyo. The success of her first exhibition led to a second show, which was sponsored by Television Tokyo and the Chinese Embassy. Other shows soon followed, e.g., at the Sogo Group department store galleries in Yokohama and seven other cities. In 1990, a further series of exhibitions (also sponsored by the Sogo Group) considerably enlarged the circle of her admirers and collectors, leading to the 1991 establishment of the Lou Zhenggang Sponsorship Committee, headed by two former prime ministers (Nakasone and Takeshita), a renowned artist and several leading bankers and industrialists. In 1991, she launched a two-year series of exhibitions held across Japan, entitled "Oriental Melody — Lou Zhenggang Calligraphy and Paintings", sponsored by the Yamaha Group. In 1993, she traveled to the U.S. for the first time, presenting a gift of 22 color paintings to UNICEF. The United Nations later issued a "first day cover" stamp issue featuring Lou's work.
In May 1993, she held an exhibition at the art gallery inside the main Mitsukoshi store in Nihonbashi, one of the most prestigious venues in Japan. Noted painter Matazo Kayama commented on the show, “Lou...leaves behind her reputation as a child prodigy and steps into a new role as a brilliant young female artist.”   Another artist, Goro Koyama, called her “...a genius chosen from among 1.2 billion Chinese.”

Thirties (1997-2006)
In 1998, Lou donated approximately US$1.5 million to establish the Lou Zhenggang Art Education Development Fund in China. Between 1998 and 2002, she created 34 color silk screen designs in a series entitled “Life and Love” [Seimei to Ai, 生命と愛]. These were radical departures from traditional black-and-white calligraphy, not only due to the bold use of color, but also the abstract images she created. This series is particularly notable for its historical significance: In 2007, the National Museum of China, which had previously not included any abstract works by contemporary artists, changed its policy and decided to add all 34 of Lou’s color works to its permanent collection.
Beginning in October 2004, Lou hosted her own program, “Calligraphy of the Heart” [Kokoro no Sho, 心の書] on TV Tokyo, a nationwide television network. In the program, she talked with various Japanese celebrities, each of whom had a special word, saying or personal motto that guided them. Lou would elegantly draw these characters and the two would discuss their meaning on camera. The program continued for almost three years, ending in 2006 just before Lou’s 40th birthday.

Forties (2006~)
As she turned 40, Lou seemed to find even greater strength and self-assurance. A 2007 Chinese TV program provided insight into this dramatic change in her development: "Lou Zhenggang says the aura of prodigy once hovered over her life like an unspeakable burden. Her own reading of history had persuaded her (that) prodigies live short lives. Lou expected to be dead by 40. After she turned forty, everything changed. She had survived the prodigy's burden. Now, after all these years, she sees herself as a normal person. And since that revelation, she's found the surest way to happiness is by following her own heart."

Recent exhibitions
Sino Group HQ, Hong Kong (2008) - The Path of Heart

Tudor Museum, Beijing (2008)

Park Prince Tower, Tokyo (2007)

Imperial Hotel, Tokyo (2006)

Public collections
Lou Zhenggang’s works have been acquired by the following museums and galleries:

National Palace Museum; Beijing Art Museum; Chinese History Museum; Chinese Art Gallery; Beijing Art Museum; Shoudu Museum; Qi Lu Calligraphy and Painting Institute; and the official provincial museums of Zhejiang Province; Jiangsu Province; Jilin Province; Heilongjiang Province; Sichuan Province; Henan Province; Shoanxi Province; Guizhou Province; and Liaoning Province.

Private Collections
Lou Zhenggang’s works have been acquired by the following individual collectors (titles as of the date of purchase):
David Rockefeller (USA)
Terunobu Maeda, CEO, Mizuho Financial Group (Japan)
Teisuke Kitayama, CEO, Sumitomo Mitsui Banking Corporation (Japan)
Motoyuki Oka, CEO, Sumitomo (Japan)
Yotaro Kobayashi, Advisor, Fuji Xerox (Japan)
Tsunehisa Katsumata, CEO, Tokyo Electric Power (Japan)
Toshiyuki Shiga, COO, Nissan Motor (Japan)
Mineo Yamamoto, CEO, All Nippon Airways (Japan)
Yoshiharu Fukuhara, CEO, Shiseido (Japan)
Takashi Goto, CEO, Seibu Holdings (Japan)
Shigetaka Komori, CEO, Fujifilm  (Japan);
Kunio Takeda, CEO, Takeda Pharmaceutical (Japan);
Ken Matsuzawa, CEO, Nipponkoa Insurance (Japan);
Sadayoshi Fujishige, CEO, Lion (Japan);
Satoshi Seino, CEO, East Japan Railway Co. (Japan);
Tamotsu Nomakuchi, Chairman, Mitsubishi Electric (Japan);
Yutaka Narita, Advisor, Dentsu (Japan);
K.K. Wong, Chairman & CEO, Kum Shing Group (HK);
Robin Y. H. Chan, Chairman, Asia Financial Holdings (HK)

Published works

 Lou Zhenggang (2004?). Kokoro [心], Sekai Bunka-sha (Tokyo).
 Lou Zhenggang (2006). Kokoro no Kizuna: Ro Sei Ko no Sho to Jinsei [心の絆ー婁正綱の書と人生], Ascom (Tokyo) 
 Lou Zhenggang (2006). Kokoro no Kotoba [心の言葉] (English Title: "The 70 Mottoes"), Sekai Bunka-sha (Tokyo) 
 Lou Zhenggang (2007). Seimei to Ai [生命と愛] Silk screen prints to commemorate the inclusion of her work in the National Museum of China collection
 Lou Zhenggang (2008). Kokoro no Sho "Rongo" [心の書「論語」], Kodansha (Tokyo)

Further information

 (2000) Seimei to Ai [生命と愛] (brochure) Fuji Television (Tokyo)
 (2008.02) Sho wa Hito Nari [書は人なり], Waraku [和楽], Shogakukan (Tokyo)
 (2006) Shogaka Ro Sei Ko [書画家　婁正綱] (Lou Zenggang, Painter/Calligrapher) (DVD, produced & sold by KK C.A.L. (www.cal-net.co.jp), Tokyo

Notes

External links
  LouZhenggang.net - Lou's "official" site (in Chinese, but note embedded video of Lou's 2008 show in HK, which has some English and a good overview of the show)
  Announcement by Fuji Sankei media group (sponsor) of December 2007 exhibition at Ueno Royal Museum in Tokyo (in Japanese)
  Lou's color works highlighted in the 2007 show at Ueno Royal Museum (in Japanese)
  50 examples of Lou's calligraphy, illustrating 50 articles on scenic spots in China, published in Nikkan Gendai [日刊現代] (in Japanese)
  Description of 2008 exhibition in Hong Kong for Sino Group (in English)
  CCTV broadcast 2008.11.19 profiling Lou and her art (in English)
  QJI, Ltd., Lou's official agent (in English and Japanese)

People's Republic of China calligraphers
Living people
1966 births
Artists from Heilongjiang
Women calligraphers